Juliana Scotá Stein (born in Passo Fundo - RS, 1970) is a visual artist and photographer. She graduated in Psychology from Universidade Federal do Paraná (UFPR) in 1992 and lived in Florence and Venice where she studied art. She continued to work with photography during the 1990s, developing her craft.

Stein's work is based in experimentation and poetic reading, leading to a reflection on the production process and rendering of the final image. She has achieved critical success in Brazil and abroad, participating in the 29th Bienal de São Paulo and joining the Latin American pavilion at the 55th Bienal de Veneza in 2013.

Exhibitions 

 2000 – III Bienal Internacional de Fotografia Cidade de Curitiba, Brasil
 2010 – 29º Bienal de São Paulo, São Paulo, Brasil
 2013 – 55. Esposizione Internazionale d’Arte la Biennale di Venezia, Veneza, Itália
 2014 – Darkest Water, Crone Galerie, Berlim, Alemanha
 2018 – It’s not clear until the night falls, Museu Oscar Niemeyer, Brasil
 2018 – Bienal Mercosul, Porto Alegre, Brasil

Awards 

 2001 – Itaú Cultural

Collections 

 Museu Oscar Niemeyer, Curitiba, Brasil
 Museu da Fotografia de Braga, Braga, Portugal
 Museu de Arte Contemporânea, Curitiba, Brasil
 Museum of 21 Century, Langenlois, Austria
 Fundação Cultural de Curitiba, Curitiba, Brasil

References

Living people
1970 births
Brazilian photographers
Federal University of Paraná alumni